Los privilegiados ("The Privileged") is a 1973 Mexican film directed by Gustavo Alatriste.

External links
 

1973 films
Mexican drama films
1970s Spanish-language films
Films directed by Gustavo Alatriste
1970s Mexican films